The Met Gala, or Met Ball, formally called the Costume Institute Gala or the Costume Institute Benefit, is an annual fundraising gala held for the benefit of the Metropolitan Museum of Art's Costume Institute in New York City. The Gala is popularly regarded as the world's most prestigious fashion event, and an invitation is highly sought after. Celebrities from various professional spheres, including fashion, film, television, theater, music, business, sports, social media, and politics, are invited to the gala, organized by the fashion magazine Vogue.

The Met Gala is an event held annually on the first Monday of May, which is the opening of the Costume Institute's annual fashion exhibit hosted on the Upper East Side of Manhattan. Many of the attendees are depicted on the covers and pages of Vogue. Each year's event celebrates the specific theme of that year's Costume Institute exhibition, which sets the tone for the formal attire of the night. Guests are expected to curate their fashion to match the theme of the exhibit, which is generally haute couture. British-American journalist Anna Wintour, who is the editor-in-chief of Vogue, has chaired or co-chaired the Met Gala since 1995.

History 
The Met Gala was established in 1948 by fashion publicist Eleanor Lambert as a fundraiser for the newly founded Costume Institute to mark the opening of its annual exhibit. The first gala comprised a dinner, and tickets were fifty dollars each. Over the first few decades of its existence, the Gala was simply one of many annual benefits held for New York charitable institutions. Accordingly, the attendees of the early galas were almost entirely members of New York high society or the city's fashion industry. From 1948 to 1971, the event was held at venues including the Waldorf Astoria, Central Park, and the Rainbow Room.

When Diana Vreeland became consultant to the Costume Institute in 1972, the Gala began to evolve into a more global and glamorous affair, although one that was still aimed at the high-societal set. The event started to become higher profile celebrity-oriented with attendees like Elizabeth Taylor, Andy Warhol, Bianca Jagger, Diana Ross, Elton John, Liza Minnelli, Madonna, and Cher intermixing with the city's elite. It was during the Vreeland years that the Gala was first held at the Met and that Gala themes were introduced.

The Gala is widely regarded as among the most prominent and most exclusive social events in the world. It is also one of the biggest fundraising nights in New York City, with US$9 million raised in 2013, $12 million the following year, and a record $17.4 million in 2022. The Met Gala is one of the most notable sources of funding for the Institute, with total contributions surpassing $200 million for the first time after the 2019 event. Anna Wintour, the chairperson of the event, assumed the chairmanship of the Institute in 1995. Also, The Met Gala is held on the first Monday in May, according to Wintour. Her guest list grew to include celebrities globally from the worlds of fashion, entertainment, business, sports, and politics who would eventually grace the pages of Vogue.
 
Since 1948, the Met Gala has occurred consecutively each year, except in 2000 and 2002. The 2020 Met Gala was canceled due to the COVID-19 pandemic. The Gala resumed in 2021, but was held in September rather than in May that year. In 2022, the Gala returned to holding its traditional May ceremony.

Present day

The Met Costume Institute Gala is a highly renowned fundraising benefit that serves as an opening celebration for the Institute's annual fashion exhibit. Following the event, the exhibition runs for several months. For example, the 2014 exhibition was scheduled to run from May 8 until August 10, 2014. The affair, attended by personalities from  the arts, fashion, high-society, film, and music, has been held at the Met since 1948 and is considered to be the fashion industry's premier annual red carpet event. Its red carpet fashions are widely photographed, reviewed, critiqued, and emulated. The museum is closed to the general public on the first Monday of May due to the Gala occurring.

Anna Wintour, the editor-in-chief of Vogue and a chairwoman of the Gala event since 1995 (excluding 1996 and 1998), oversees both the benefit committee and the guest list, with Vogue staffers helping assemble the list of invitees. In 2014, the individual tickets cost US$30,000 for those outside the official guest list, after prices were raised by $10,000 to increase the exclusivity of the event. The annual guest list is limited to approximately 650 or 700 people. Starting in the 2020s, the Met Gala has started including social-media influencers.

The 2015 Gala and its theme of "China: Through the Looking Glass" became the subject of a documentary—The First Monday in May, directed by Andrew Rossi and produced by Condé Nast Entertainment, Vogue, and Relativity Studios. 225 approved photographers, reporters, and social media participants documented the event for the documentary. All other attendees were forbidden from using social media at the event. Guests received notices about the restriction of selfies and social media inside the gala. The no-selfie ordinance was extended to the following editions of the Met Gala. As of 2018, Wintour announced that guests may not be allowed to attend the gala before the age of 18.

Theme
The exhibit is assigned a specific theme each year, with guests being expected to follow but not mandated. It includes a cocktail hour and a formal dinner. During the cocktail hour, guests arrive to walk on the red carpet, tour the year's special themed exhibition, and be seated before the dinner party that includes entertainment from the preeminent entertainers of the day. The theme not only sets the tone for the annual exhibit, but also for the guests who attempt to dress to uphold the theme of the year, oftentimes causing runs on certain fashion themes among the world's leading fashion retailers. Sometimes, such as in 2013, with Punk: Chaos to Couture, the theme given is considered unclear or difficult to follow because it does not provide a clear stylistic directive. At other times, such as in 2014, with Charles James: Beyond Fashion, the theme may be far more challenging for one gender, as James made clothing intended for women. Although, according to Vogue in 2021 Met Gala: American Fashion, Andrew Bolton was "really impressed by American designers’ responses to the social and political climate, particularly around issues of body inclusivity and gender fluidity". Some other themes throughout the years were In America: An Anthology of Fashion (2022), In America: A Lexicon of Fashion (2021), and About Time: Fashion and Duration (2020).

Controversy
Models Naomi Campbell and Stephanie Seymour pulled out of attending the 2009 Gala at the last minute, in a show of support for designer Azzedine Alaïa. After discovering that none of his work was included in the Costume Institute exhibit, Alaïa asked the models not to wear the dresses he had designed for them to the Gala and they chose not to attend altogether. Alaïa was well-known for having close relationships with his models, and his exclusion from the "Model as Muse" exhibit was seen as a snub. He criticized Wintour (with whom he had a longtime feud) for having "too much power over this museum."

In 2014, the theme was "Charles James: Beyond Fashion," when the Met Gala announced a dress code requiring white tie, a number of media outlets pointed out the difficulty and expense of obtaining traditional white tie, even for the celebrity guests. Further controversy at the 2014 Met Gala included a streaker who wasn't able to make it up the stairs but nevertheless caused a commotion. This was followed by a fight in the elevator at the after party between Solange Knowles and Jay-Z. Security tape showed Solange angrily speaking at Jay-Z before turning into a physical altercation in which she hits and kicks him.

In 2015, the Gala's theme, originally named "Chinese Whispers: Tales of the East in Art, Film and Fashion," was renamed to "China: Through the Looking Glass." The theme was met with critics saying it was "A reminder of the subtle institutionalized racism that's been compounded by centuries of Asian isolationism across the board, and enduring Western stereotypes exacerbated by ignorance and the meme-able nature of social media." Among one of the most criticized actresses was Sarah Jessica Parker for a headdress she wore which was thought to conform to the Dragon Lady stereotype.

In 2016, Madonna, while channeling the theme "Manus x Machina: Fashion in an Age of Technology," provided one of the most controversial outfits in the Gala's history. She appeared in an ensemble designed by Givenchy creative director Riccardo Tisci exposing both her breasts and buttocks. Madonna hit back on her official social media channels by stating, "We have fought and continue to fight for civil rights and gay rights around the world. When it comes to women's rights we are still in the Dark Ages. My dress at the Met Ball was a political statement as well as a fashion statement."

The 2017 Met Gala's theme was "Rei Kawakubo/Comme des Garçons." At the 2017 gala, Kendall Jenner wore a see-though dress. The mesh dress had short sleeves, a slit across its bodice, a draped back, and slit up the leg. Jenner received much criticism on social media platforms, especially Twitter, for showing too much skin, while others criticized her look because of the similarities to Rose McGowan MTV VMAs dress in 1998.

The 2018 Gala had a Roman Catholic theme, and included Rihanna wearing a papal mitre. Critics on social media called it "blasphemous" and "sacrilegious cosplay," even though the Catholic Church lent more than forty papal vestments from the Vatican, and Cardinal Timothy M. Dolan attended. Kyle Smith argued that the Catholic Church was in fact "abetting the mockery of its symbols." Rihanna faced controversy as she wore a pearl and jewel-encrusted robe, matching papal mitre and necklace, Christian Louboutin heels, dressed as a Pope.  Her look was designed by Margiela. Screenwriter Lena Waithe embraced the LGBT community, wearing a rainbow cape, displaying a pride flag designed by Carolina Herrera. Waithe embodied what God meant to her and explained, "you talk about church and Catholicism, it's about—you were made in God's image...The theme to me is be yourself."

The theme of the 2019 Met Gala was "Camp: Notes on Fashion." The exhibition was inspired by Susan Sontag's 1964 essay "Notes on "Camp"." Andrew Bulton, Curator in Charge of the Costume Institute, explains how he finds that Sontag argues that camp is "love of the unnatural: of artifice and exaggeration . . . style at the expense of content . . . the triumph of the epicene style." Many celebrities took full advantage of the theme dressing in colors, glitter, and overexaggerated looks. Some celebrities who were found by the media to be controversial in the 2019 Met Gala include Kim Kardashian, who wore a Thierry Mugler form-fitting tan button up dress made to look wet with the addition of crystal droplets. While the dress itself was on theme, the controversy was in the fact that Kardashian said she could not sit down or go to the bathroom because of how the corset of the dress restricted her. At this time, Kim Kardashian was facing controversy for setting unrealistic beauty standards. In an Instagram post, she also mentioned she had to take "corset breathing lessons" in order to wear the dress. The comedian and writer Lena Waithe arrived at the gala wearing a suit with the words "Black Drag Queens Inventend [sic] Camp" on the back. The message was intended to show how camp has been a mode for marginalized people, queer people, and people of color, to reclaim the idea of taste.

The 2021 Met Gala theme was "In America: A Lexicon of Fashion." The American theme of the gala allowed celebrities to go in many different directions with how they chose to embody the theme. U.S. Representative Alexandria Ocasio-Cortez attended the 2021 Met Gala dressed by designer Aurora James. Ocasio-Cortez's controversial look was bold and targeted the attendees of the Met; she wore a white off-the-shoulder gown with the phrase "tax the rich" sewn onto the back in bold red satin lettering. This look faced controversy as many thought it was hypocritical to condemn wealth inequality while attending an event with a $35,000 ticket. In an interview, designer Aurora James explains how she thinks it smart to be able to deliver the message directly to those who need to hear it. Another controversial look at the 2021 Met Gala was that of model and actress Cara Delevingne, who wore a custom Dior white pantsuit and breastplate. The breastplate had the words "Peg The Patriarchy" stitched across the front in red lettering. In an interview, Delevingne explains, "It's about women empowerment, gender equality — it's a bit like, 'Stick it to the man.'"

Gallery

List of Met Galas
The following is a list of Met Galas, as well as the chairs and entertainment, for the Galas that have taken place since themes were introduced in 1973.

See also
 The First Monday in May
 Ocean's 8

Note

References

External links
Official website

1948 establishments in New York City
Annual events in New York City
Balls in the United States
Fashion events in the United States
Metropolitan Museum of Art
Recurring events established in 1948
Vogue (magazine)